Two vessels of the United States Navy have borne the name USS Grenadier, named in honor of the grenadiers, a family (Macrouridae) of soft-finned deep-sea fishes with long, tapering bodies and short, pointed tails, also known as rattails.

United States Navy ship names